Frank Alois Pitelka (27 March 1916 – 10 October 2003) was an American ornithologist.  He was the 2001 recipient of the Cooper Ornithological Society’s Loye and Alden Miller Research Award, which is given in recognition of lifetime achievement in ornithological research.
In 1992, Dr. Pitelka received the Eminent Ecologist Award from the Ecological Society of America.

References

External links
 Frank Pitelka obituary

American ornithologists
1916 births
2003 deaths
20th-century American zoologists